Anil Kumar Jha is a Nepali politician who served as a member of the House Of Representatives, representing Rautahat-1 constituency from 2017-2022.

References

Living people
People from Rautahat District
Nepal MPs 2017–2022
Members of the 1st Nepalese Constituent Assembly
Loktantrik Samajwadi Party, Nepal politicians
Nepal Sadbhawana Party politicians
Rastriya Janata Party Nepal politicians
People's Socialist Party, Nepal politicians
1967 births